Ayliny Martínez (born 1979) is a team handball player from Cuba. She has played on the Cuba women's national handball team, and participated at the 2011 World Women's Handball Championship in Brazil.

References

1979 births
Living people
Cuban female handball players